Bert Bergsma (born August 12, 1955 in Apeldoorn, Gelderland) is a former freestyle swimmer from the Netherlands, who competed for his native country at the 1972 Summer Olympics in Munich, West Germany. There he was eliminated as a member (second swimmer) of the Dutch relay teams, in the 4 × 100 m freestyle and the 4 × 200 m freestyle.

References
 Dutch Olympic Committee

1955 births
Living people
Dutch male freestyle swimmers
Olympic swimmers of the Netherlands
Swimmers at the 1972 Summer Olympics
Sportspeople from Apeldoorn
20th-century Dutch people